Paulo Roberto Oliveira Baptista  known as Chapinha (born 1 July 1992) is a Portuguese football player who plays for Anadia.

Club career
He made his professional debut in the Segunda Liga for Feirense on 11 August 2013 in a game against Leixões.

References

External links

1992 births
Sportspeople from Santa Maria da Feira
Living people
Portuguese footballers
Association football wingers
Segunda Divisão players
C.D. Feirense players
Liga Portugal 2 players
U.D. Leiria players
A.D. Sanjoanense players
Anadia F.C. players